This is a list of museums in Sweden.

By county

Blekinge
Marinmuseum
Ropewalk (Karlskrona)

Dalarna
Great Copper Mountain
Zorn Collections

Gävleborg
Swedish Railway Museum

Gotland
Gotland Museum

Halland
Bexell Cottage
Ekomuseum nedre Ätradalen
Göran Karlsson's Motor Museum
Halland Museum of Cultural History
HSwMS Najaden (1897)
Mjellby Art Museum
Tjolöholm Castle

Jämtland
Jamtli
Optand Teknikland

Jönköping

 Match Museum
 Gladiators – Heroes of the Colosseum
 Jönköpings läns museum
 Husqvarna Factory Museum

Kalmar
Borgholm Castle
Döderhultarn Museum
Eketorp
Kalmar Castle
Kingdom of Crystal

Kronoberg
IKEA Museum
Kingdom of Crystal
Swedish Emigrant Institute

Norrbotten
Gammelstad Church Town
Norrbottens Museum
Piteå Wall of Fame
Teknikens Hus

Skåne
Galerie St. Petri
Glimmingehus
Kulturen
Landskrona Citadel
Malmö Konsthall
Malmö Castle
Museum of Failure
Museum of Sketches for Public Art
Rooseum
Sofiero Castle
Sövdeborg Castle
Svaneholm Castle
Teknik på farfars tid
Wanås Castle

Stockholm

Södermanland
Femöre battery
Gripsholm Castle
Östra Södermanlands Järnväg
Sörmland Museum
Tullgarn Palace

Uppsala
Bror Hjorths Hus
Geijersgården
Gustavianum
Paleontological Museum of Uppsala University
Upplandsmuseet
Uppsala Castle
Uppsala University Coin Cabinet
Upsala-Lenna Jernväg

Värmland
Mårbacka
Ransäters bruksherrgård

Västerbotten
Bildmuseet

Västernorrland
Gene fornby

Västmanland
Engelsberg
Engelsberg-Norberg Railway
Strömsholm Palace
Tidö Castle

Västra Götaland
Gothenburg Museum of Art
Bohus Fortress
City Museum of Gothenburg
Ekomuseum nedre Ätradalen
Fladen
Göteborgs Konsthall
Gunnebo House
Karlsborg Fortress
Läckö Castle
Nordic Watercolour Museum
Röhsska Museum
Skansen Kronan
HSwMS Småland (J19)
HSwMS Sölve
Textile Museum of Borås
Torpa stenhus
Universeum
Viking (barque)
Volvo Museum
Museum of World Culture

Örebro
Cookbook museum

Östergötland
Charlottenborg Castle
Ekenäs Castle
Löfstad Castle
Motala longwave transmitter
Motala Motor Museum
Övralid
Swedish Air Force Museum
Vadstena Castle
Museum of Work

Other
Internetmuseum, an online museum

See also 

 List of museums
 Tourism in Sweden
 Culture of Sweden

Museums
 
Sweden
Museums
Museums
Sweden